"Without You" is a song by the French DJ David Guetta, featuring vocals by the American singer Usher. It was released as the third single from Guetta's fifth studio album, Nothing but the Beat, on 29 September 2011. The single peaked at number four on the Billboard Hot 100 in the US, becoming Guetta's third top ten single, following "Club Can't Handle Me" and "Sexy Bitch", as well as his highest peaking in the US to date. By November 2013, the song had sold 2,684,000 copies in the US.

Background 
The song features the vocals of R&B singer Usher, who told Billboard magazine that the project was, "maybe the biggest song I've made in my life". Guetta said, "We were in bargaining sessions for a while. Usher was saying, 'I need this record for my album.' I said, 'I'm sorry, I cannot give it to you.' After a while he called me back and gave in." Guetta told MTV News why he chose Usher to guest on this song. "It's just totally emotional," he said. "Some of the record is a proper ballad, and then it goes to that crazy dance beat. It's perfect for him, because he's famous for his ballads. And he's also now famous for those big club records that he comes with. He's an amazing dancer, so I felt like he was the artist that I needed." Usher told MTV News that this ode to not giving up on love in the face of adversity resonated with him personally. "I think the world wanted a record like that. That [song] really spoke to the journey that I've actually been on in the last three years... Traveling all around the world, music sounds different. There's many different genres, and when you see R&B and pop and house, as well as electronic, come together, that's the reality of what music is."

Composition 
"Without You" was written by Taio Cruz, Usher Raymond, Rico Love, David Guetta, Giorgio Tuinfort and Frédéric Riesterer, and produced by Guetta, Tuinfort and Riesterer. Lyrically, the song laments a heavy subject - life without someone who means the world to you. Amy Sciarretto of Pop Crush wrote that the chorus "invite lots of dancing, but this isn't much of clubby rager. Structurally, the song reminds us of Madonna's 'Ray of Light'; that's not to suggest that 'Without You' sounds like 'Ray of Light', but it shares the same formula and airy energy. Lyrics also heavily influenced by U2’s With or Without You."

"Without You" is set in common time maintaining a tempo of 128 beats per minute. The song is in the key of D-major and has elements of pop, dance and R&B. Usher's vocals range from D3 to D5.

Critical reception 
In a favorable review, Amy Sciarretto of Pop Crush wrote that the song is "a light, hands-in-the-air and somewhat ethereal song" and that "the heft of the words juxtaposed against the feathery music works and allows the song to remain buoyant and well, not a downer despite its unhappy musings".

Jon Dolan of Rolling Stone wrote that on the track "Usher gets lonely over Coldplay-style guitar". Village Voices Carol Cooper gave a negative review, writing, "Usher, while pushing himself vocally, sounds like a Glee Project."

Music video
The music video was filmed towards the end of July 2011 on a beach in Portugal. The full music video was released on October 14, 2011. The video shows views of different parties in Thailand, the United States, Brazil and South Africa, among other places. Continental drift starts to take place as a result and all the parties on the different continents amalgamate to form one big party. It also has scenes with Usher in front of a Rio de Janeiro beach background. The final shot shows Earth and all the continents merged into one supercontinent.

Track listing
"Without You" (Extended mix)
"Without You" (Nicky Romero remix)
"Without You" (R3HAB's XS remix)
"Without You" (Armin van Buuren remix)
"Without You" (Radio edit)

Credits and personnel
Recording
Additional production, mixed and mastered at Test Pressing Studio, Naples, Italy
Vocals mixed at The Mix Room at Oasis Mastering, Burbank, California

Personnel
Usher Raymond IV – songwriter (courtesy of LaFace Records), lead vocals
Taio Cruz – songwriter (courtesy of Island Records), background vocals
Rico Love – songwriter
David Guetta – producer, background vocals, songwriter
Giorgio Tuinfort – producer, songwriter
Frédéric Riesterer – producer, songwriter
Black Raw – additional producer, mixing, mastering
Mark "Exit" Goodchild – vocal mixing
Kevin Hissink – guitar

Charts

Weekly charts

Year-end charts

Certifications

Radio and release history

References

2011 singles
2011 songs
2010s ballads
Synth-pop ballads
David Guetta songs
Usher (musician) songs
Songs written by David Guetta
Songs written by Giorgio Tuinfort
Songs written by Rico Love
Songs written by Taio Cruz
Songs written by Frédéric Riesterer
Torch songs
Song recordings produced by David Guetta